Noel Patrick Zancanella is an American record producer and songwriter based in Los Angeles, California. He has written and produced songs for rock and pop artists such as Taylor Swift, OneRepublic, Maroon 5, B.o.B., Gym Class Heroes, Gavin DeGraw, and Colbie Caillat.

History
Zancanella's father was a jazz musician, and Noel Zancanella grew up playing bass and drums before picking up an MPC drum machine and immersing himself in hip-hop as an artist/producer. In Los Angeles, he took a job at the famous Village Studios and soon found himself working alongside the likes of Janet Jackson and TK. "It was an inspiring time for me. It was the first time I was so deeply exposed to pop," Zancanella said. Eventually, he crossed paths with OneRepublic's Ryan Tedder who, at the time, was working with Timbaland. Initially, Zancanella provided beats and tracks, but through his time with Tedder, he expanded his songwriting skills.

Since 2009, Zancanella has been signed to Patriot Games Publishing, a company founded by Ryan Tedder. The signing came through Zancanella co-writing OneRepublic's hit "Good Life", which peaked at number eight on the Billboard Hot 100 chart.

In 2015, Zancanella received the Songwriter of the Year Award at the BMI Pop Awards.

In 2016, he won the Grammy Award for Album of the Year for his production with Taylor Swift and Ryan Tedder of Swift's fifth album 1989, including "Welcome to New York" and "I Know Places".

References

Record producers from California
Record producers from Colorado
Songwriters from Colorado
Songwriters from California
Living people
Year of birth missing (living people)